Pakistan participated in the 2014 Asian Beach Games in Phuket, Thailand from 14 to 23 November 2014. It will participate in the beach handball,  beach kabaddi, beach wrestling, bodybuilding, ju-jitsu, sailing, squash and windsurfing  events.

Medal summary

Medal by sport

Medal by Date

External links
Official Site

References 

Nations at the 2014 Asian Beach Games
2014
Asian Beach Games